Sundt is a Norwegian surname. Notable people with the surname include:

Arthur Sundt (1899–1971), Norwegian politician
Egil Sundt (1903–1950), Norwegian lawyer and civil servant
Eilert Sundt (1817–1875), Norwegian theologist and sociologist
Guy Sundt (1898–1955), American athlete, coach and athletics administrator
Halfdan Sundt (1873–1951), Norwegian physician and politician
Harald Sundt (1873–1952), Norwegian businessman
Michael Andreas Sundt, Norwegian politician
Morten Ludvig Sundt (1809–1891), Norwegian farmer and politician
Petter C. G. Sundt (1945–2007), Norwegian businessman
Vigleik Trygve Sundt (1873–1948), Norwegian lawyer, genealogist and politician

See also
Carl Sundt-Hansen (1841–1907), Norwegian-Danish painter
Sundt Air, a Norwegian airline

Norwegian-language surnames